No Es Lo Mismo Tour is a concert tour by Spanish singer Alejandro Sanz as promoting his album No Es Lo Mismo.

Tour set list 
 12 Por 8
 Eso
 Quisiera Ser
 Cuando Nadie Me Ve
 La Habana
 Hoy Llueve, Hoy Duele
 La Fuerza del Corazón
 Regálame la Silla Donde Te Esperé
 He Sido Feliz Contigo
 Try To Save Your Song
 Yo Sé lo Que la Gente Piensa
 ¿Lo Ves?
 El Alma al Aire
 Y Sólo Se Me Ocurre Amarte
 Aprendiz
 Corazón Partío
 Medley: Y, ¿Si Fuera Ella?, Amiga Mía, Mi Soledad y Yo
 No Es lo Mismo

Tour dates

Box office score data (Billboard)

Band 
 Albert Menéndez – Keyboards and Musical Director
 Jeffery Suttles / Nathaniel Townsley – Drums
 Luis Dulzaides – Percussion
 Agustín Gereñu – Bass
 Jose Antonio Rodríguez – Spanish guitar 
 Michael Ciro and David Palau – Guitars
 Alfonso Perez - Piano and Backing vocal
 Patxi Urchegui – Trumpet
 Carlos Martin – Trombone
 Jon Robles – Saxophone
 Ester Gonzalez / Txell Sust – Backing vocal

References

External links 
 Web oficial de Alejandro Sanz

2004 concert tours
Alejandro Sanz